The William Whalley Homestead  is an historic farmstead in Little Compton, Rhode Island.  The main house is a -story wood-frame structure, probably built sometime between 1815 and 1830.  The property includes a late 19th century gabled barn and a stone and wood outbuilding, and is bounded by a low stone wall.  The main house is a fairly typical Cape style house, five bays wide, with a central chimney.  The property as a whole is a well-preserved example of a typical 19th-century farmstead in the area.

The homestead was listed on the National Historic Register in 1988.

See also
National Register of Historic Places listings in Newport County, Rhode Island

References

External links

Houses on the National Register of Historic Places in Rhode Island
Federal architecture in Rhode Island
Houses in Newport County, Rhode Island
Buildings and structures in Little Compton, Rhode Island
National Register of Historic Places in Newport County, Rhode Island